Shan Ha is the name or part of the name of several places in Hong Kong:
 Shan Ha (Pa Mei), a village in Tung Chung, on Lantau Island
 Shan Ha Tsuen, a village in Yuen Long District
 Tsang Tai Uk, also known as Shan Ha Wai, a walled village in Sha Tin District
 Wang Toi Shan Ha San Uk Tsuen, a village in Yuen Long District